Dr. Prodosh Aich (born 1933) is a retired Bengali-Indian professor, formerly of the University of Oldenburg, and the author of several books.

He is chiefly known for his German language publication Lies With Long Legs, (Lügen mit langen Beinen), that questions the foundations and veracity of Indology, Indologists, Aryans, Sanskrit, Hinduism, Indo-European-language families and race along with many more.

Biography

He was born in 1933 in Calcutta (now Kolkata), India. He did his high school and philosophical studies in India, and studied sociology, ethnology, and philosophy at the University of Cologne in Germany. He also taught sociology at the University of Rajasthan, University of Cologne and Oldenburg University.

He has published many essays and papers in readers and journals and made several documentary films as well as authored several books.

Bibliography
 Truths - European Christians in History in 2015
Lies With Long Legs — Discoveries, Scholars, Science, Enlightenment Documentary Narration (Lügen mit langen Beinen, German) in 2003.
Thorns on a Righteous Path (Preis des aufrechten Gangs, German) in 2001.
Coloured amongst whites (Farbige unter Weissen, German) in 1962.

References

External links
Lies with Long Legs

Lies with Long Legs Review
Zimbio - Indian Professor Prodosh Aich, calls Indologist Max Mueller a "swindler". He describes yet another Indologist William Jones a "fraud"

1933 births
Bengali Hindus
Bengali writers
20th-century Bengalis
20th-century Indian non-fiction writers
Writers from Kolkata
Living people
University of Cologne alumni
Academic staff of the University of Rajasthan
Academic staff of the University of Cologne
Academic staff of the University of Oldenburg
20th-century Indian essayists
Indian male essayists
Indian male writers
20th-century Indian scholars